John Costelloe may refer to:
 John Costelloe (politician)
 John Costelloe (actor)

See also
 John Costello (disambiguation)